Billy Evans (1884–1956) was an American umpire in Major League Baseball.

Billy Evans may also refer to:

Billy Lee Evans (born 1941), American politician from Georgia
Billy Evans (footballer, born 1921) (1921–1960), English football (soccer) player
Billy Evans (Australian footballer) (born 1996), Australian rules footballer
Billy Evans (basketball, born 1932) (1932–2020), American basketball player who played at the University of Kentucky
Billy Evans (basketball, born 1947) (born 1947), American basketball player who played at Boston College and then in the ABA
Billy Evans, hotel heir reportedly married to Elizabeth Holmes

See also 
Billie Evans, married name of British singer and actress Billie Piper when she was married to DJ Chris Evans
Bill Evans (disambiguation)
William Evans (disambiguation)